Uwe Behrens (born 10 April 1959) is a German former footballer who played as a striker.

Behrens made 16 appearances for SV Werder Bremen in the Bundesliga during his playing career. He is kit manager for the club.

References

External links 
 
 

1959 births
Living people
Footballers from Bremen
German footballers
Association football forwards
Bundesliga players
2. Bundesliga players
SV Werder Bremen players
SV Arminia Hannover players
20th-century German people